Major Pradeep Tathawade, KC was an officer in the Jammu and Kashmir Light Infantry regiment of the Indian Army who fought terrorist in Poonch district of Kashmir in June 2000. He was posthumously awarded the Kirti Chakra in October 2001.

See also 
 Shahid Major Pradeep Tathawade Udyan

References 

Indian military personnel killed in action
Recipients of the Kirti Chakra
Kirti Chakra